Tweety family member 3 is a protein that in humans is encoded by the TTYH3 gene.

Function

This gene encodes a member of the tweety family of proteins. Members of this family function as chloride anion channels. The encoded protein functions as a calcium(2+)-activated large conductance chloride(-) channel. [provided by RefSeq, Jul 2008].

References

Further reading